The World Junior Alpine Skiing Championships 2002 were the 21st World Junior Alpine Skiing Championships, held between 27 February and 3 March 2002 in Tarvisio, Italy.

Medal winners

Men's events

Two silver medals were awarded in the Super-G.

Women's events

External links
World Junior Alpine Skiing Championships 2002 results at fis-ski.com

World Junior Alpine Skiing Championships
2002 in alpine skiing
Alpine skiing competitions in Italy
2002 in Italian sport